Mohamed Seif El-Din (born 1965) is a Syrian politician. He has been the Minister of Social Affairs and Labour since 2021. He had previously served as Assistant to the Minister of Public Works and Housing for Legal Affairs and Services. He was educated at Damascus University, where he studied law.

Career
2004–2012: Director of Administrative Affairs at the Ministry of Public Works

2012–2021: Assistant to the Minister of Public Works and Housing for Legal Affairs and Services

Personal life
Married with two children.

See also 

 Second Hussein Arnous government

References 

Living people
1965 births
21st-century Syrian politicians
Arab Socialist Ba'ath Party – Syria Region politicians
Damascus University alumni
Syrian ministers of social affairs and labour